Mbarga is a surname. Notable people with the surname include:

Prince Nico Mbarga, (1950–1997), Nigerian musician
Joséphine Mbarga-Bikié (born 1979), Cameroonian long jumper
Janvier Charles Mbarga (born 1985), Cameroonian footballer
Franck Mbarga, Cameroonian footballer

Surnames of African origin